Rakovec may refer to:

 Rakovec, Bogovinje, a village in Bogovinje Municipality, Republic of North Macedonia
 Rakovec, Brežice, a village in the Municipality of Brežice, Slovenia
 Rakovec, Metlika, a village in the Municipality of Metlika, Slovenia
 Rakovec, Šmarje pri Jelšah, a village in the Municipality of Šmarje pri Jelšah, Slovenia
 Rakovec, a village in Čaška Municipality, Republic of North Macedonia
 Rakovec nad Ondavou, a village and municipality in the Michalovce District in the Kosice Region of Slovakia
 Rakovec, Varaždin County, a village near Ljubešćica, Croatia
 Rakovec, Vitanje, a former village in the Municipality of Vitanje, Slovenia
 Rakovec, Zagreb County, a village and a municipality in Croatia
 Veľký Rakovec, a village in western Ukraine in the Irshavskiy Raion in the Zakarpattia Oblast

See also
Rakovica (disambiguation)